Federica Radicchi (born 21 December 1988) is an Italian water polo player.

Career 
She competed at the 2012 Summer Olympics and the 2016 Summer Olympics.
She was part of the Italian team winning the bronze medal at the 2015 World Aquatics Championships, where she played in the centre forward position.

See also
 List of Olympic medalists in water polo (women)
 List of World Aquatics Championships medalists in water polo

References

External links
 
 

1988 births
Living people
Sportspeople from Rome
Italian female water polo players
Water polo centre backs
Water polo players at the 2012 Summer Olympics
Water polo players at the 2016 Summer Olympics
Medalists at the 2016 Summer Olympics
Olympic silver medalists for Italy in water polo
World Aquatics Championships medalists in water polo
21st-century Italian women